Jill Kennedy is a Paralympian athlete from United States competing mainly in category F40 throws events.

Kennedy has competed in three Paralympics across two sports. Her first appearance was in Sydney in 2000 where she competed in the women's up to 40 kg powerlifting. Four years later, in Athens, she successfully transitioned to the throwing events where she won two bronze medals in the F40 discus and javelin and competing in the shot put.  In the 2008 Summer Paralympics in Beijing, she again competed in the shot put and discus but failed to medal in either.

External links
 profile on paralympic.org

Paralympic track and field athletes of the United States
Paralympic powerlifters of the United States
Powerlifters at the 2000 Summer Paralympics
Athletes (track and field) at the 2004 Summer Paralympics
Athletes (track and field) at the 2008 Summer Paralympics
Paralympic bronze medalists for the United States
American powerlifters
Living people
Medalists at the 2004 Summer Paralympics
Year of birth missing (living people)
Paralympic medalists in athletics (track and field)
American female discus throwers
American female javelin throwers
21st-century American women